The 20th District of the Iowa Senate is located in southern Iowa, and is currently composed of Polk County.

Current elected officials
Brad Zaun is the senator currently representing the 20th District.

The area of the 20th District contains two Iowa House of Representatives districts:
The 39th District (represented by Eddie Andrews)
The 40th District (represented by John Forbes)

The district is also located in Iowa's 3rd congressional district, which is represented by Zach Nunn.

Past senators
The district has previously been represented by:

Edgar Holden, 1983–1988
Maggie Tinsman, 1989–1992
Jack Rife, 1993–2000
Tom Fiegen, 2001–2002
John Putney, 2003–2008
Tim Kapucian, 2009–2012
Brad Zaun, 2013–present

See also
Iowa General Assembly
Iowa Senate

References

20